Sam Tsoutsouvas is an American veteran actor and lyricist with experience in the stage, television and films. He appeared in 1967 and 1968 at The Utah Shakespearean Festival in Cedar City, Utah, before attending the Juilliard Drama School in Lincoln Center, New York City. In the 1968 season he played Bassanio in The Merchant of Venice, and Mercutio in Romeo and Juliet.

Broadway plays
 Scapin (1973), Lyrics
 Three Sisters (1973–1974), as Solyony
 The Beggar's Opera (1973–1974), as Lockit
 Measure for Measure (1973–1974), as Lucio
 Three Sisters (1975), as Solyony/Andrei Prozorov
 The Time of Your Life (1975), as Willie/Blick
 Edward II (1975), as Young Mortimer
 By Jeeves (2001), as Sir Watkyn Bassett
 Our Country's Good (1991), as Captain David Collins/Robert Sideway

Regional Theatre
 Work Song: Three Views of Frank Lloyd Wright (2004–2005), as Frank Lloyd Wright--City Theatre
 A Number (2008), as Salter--Pittsburgh Public Theater
 Antony and Cleopatra (2011), as Antony--Pittsburgh Irish and Classical Theatre

Selected filmography
 Ghost (1990), as Minister

TV appearances
 Soldier of Fortune, Inc. (1998)
 Law & Order: Criminal Intent - The Posthumous Collection" (2004), as Gerhardt Heltman

Video games
 Grand Theft Auto: San Andreas (2004), as James Pedeaston

References

External links
 
 

Year of birth missing (living people)
Living people
American male musical theatre actors
American male film actors
American male television actors
Place of birth missing (living people)